Ectoedemia spiraeae is a moth of the family Nepticulidae. It is only known from Slovakia and the Mátra mountains in Hungary.

The wingspan is 4.8-5.6 mm. Adults have been reared from February to March and from May to June. There is probably one generation per year.

The larvae feed on Spiraea media. They mine the leaves of their host plant. The mine consists of a corridor following a vein, occasionally the leaf margin, filled with brown, dispersed frass. The corridor widens into a large, irregular blotch with blackish dispersed frass.

External links
Fauna Europaea
bladmineerders.nl
A Taxonomic Revision Of The Western Palaearctic Species Of The Subgenera Zimmermannia Hering And Ectoedemia Busck s.str. (Lepidoptera, Nepticulidae), With Notes On Their Phylogeny

Nepticulidae
Moths of Europe
Moths described in 1983